The Brazil Squadron, the Brazil Station, or the South Atlantic Squadron was an overseas military station established by the United States in 1826 to protect American commerce in the South Atlantic during a war between Brazil and Argentina. When the Cisplatine War between Argentina and Brazil ended, the station remained and continued to protect American interests during several other conflicts. The squadron was also active in the Blockade of Africa suppressing the Atlantic slave trade. Under French Chadwick, the South Atlantic Squadron was involved in the 1904 Perdicaris Incident in Tangier, Morocco. It ceased to exist when it was absorbed into the North Atlantic Fleet in 1905.

Falklands Expedition

An expedition to the Falkland Islands was launched in late 1831 when the sloop-of-war USS Lexington was sent to Puerto Soledad to investigate the capture and possible armament of two American whalers. When the sailors arrived at the settlement, its Argentine population was found to be suffering from starvation so Commander Silas Duncan evacuated the colonists to the mainland. Because of this the Falklands were left unpopulated and open for British colonization a few years later. Argentina's dispute with the United Kingdom over rights to the islands culminated in the 1982 Falklands War which left the British in control. Exaggerated accounts in opposition of the American expedition claim that the USS Lexington destroyed the town with naval gunfire, but this never occurred.

Slave trade

See also
 Charles G. Ridgely

References

 
 

Ship squadrons of the United States Navy
1826 establishments in the United States